Colossus is a  Ferris wheel located at the 1904 World's Fair section of Six Flags St. Louis in Eureka, Missouri.

The ride debuted at the 1984 New Orleans World's Fair, one of multiple rides at the fair that were operated by Six Flags. About three years after being at the fair, it was relocated to Six Flags St. Louis.

History

1984 New Orleans World's Fair

Colossus was originally debuted at the 1984 New Orleans World's Fair. It and the other rides there were operated by Six Flags, and it cost $2.50 per passenger to ride.

Six Flags St. Louis

Colossus stands where the Pet-A-Pet petting zoo used to be. It was removed in 1985 to make room for the addition of Colossus in the 1986 season.

In 1988, an animated Jack-o'-Lantern face made up of orange lights, nicknamed "Jack", and a corresponding lighting program were installed on Colossus for the very first year of Fright Nights (now Fright Fest) at the park. While the lights stayed on the ride all-year afterwards, they were only used for the Halloween season. The light program returned every year until 2016, when it was removed.

In 1992, 2,200 lights were added to the ride for the main season, which displayed a 24-pattern performance with a starburst finale. During the months that the park was closed, they displayed a giant clock face which was visible to those passing on nearby Interstate 44.

Incidents
On June 18, 2009, a power outage at the park stranded some guests on rides, forcing them to have to wait until they were manually released by park officials. Colossus was the most difficult ride to release riders from, because, with no power, it had to be manually cranked to get the passengers to the ground, which took about 75 minutes.

References

External links

Six Flags attractions
Six Flags St. Louis
Ferris wheels in the United States
Amusement rides introduced in 1984
Amusement rides manufactured by Carousel Holland B.V.
Buildings and structures in St. Louis County, Missouri
1984 Louisiana World Exposition